Khalil George Francis is a Pakistani politician who had been a member of the National Assembly of Pakistan, from June 2013 to May 2018.

Political career

He was elected to the National Assembly of Pakistan as a candidate of Pakistan Muslim League (N) on a seat reserved for minorities in the 2013 Pakistani general election. During his tenure as Member of the National Assembly, he served as the Federal Parliamentary Secretary for Religious Affairs and Inter-faith Harmony.

In May 2018, he joined Balochistan Awami Party.

References

Living people
Pakistani MNAs 2013–2018
Pakistan Muslim League (N) politicians
Year of birth missing (living people)